The Centre d’entrainement aux actions en zone urbaine (CENZUB) is a purpose-built facility for training French armed forces in urban warfare skills. It is located at Sissonne in north-eastern France. It is the largest training area of its type in Europe. There are two constructed districts - Beausejour and Jeoffrecourt.

British Army units have used the facility while learning French urban tactics and using French equipment. This part of a wider programme for Anglo-French military cooperation following the Defence and Security Co-operation Treaty signed by British Prime Minister David Cameron and French President Nicolas Sarkozy in November 2010.

Facilities
CENZUB offers several varied urban training environments:

 Technical and tactical skills acquisition module (Module d'acquisition des savoir-faire techniques et tactiques - MASTTAC)
A street with roofless houses. Instructors are able to observe trainees and to move ahead to adjust the environment during training sessions.

 Beauséjour
 The village of Beauséjour consists of 63 different houses, a variety of obstacles (barriers, barricades, rubble), different types of streets (wide, narrow, S-shaped or unobstructed). It consists in various modules:
 the village itself
 a slum area in which it is impossible to enter with vehicles
 a caravan camp
 a street made up from 20-foot standard container, to refresh skills
 a hamlet intended to show various ways in which a building could be "hardened", ie, made more defensible (setting up sandbags on the floor, booby traps, etc).

 The ammunition depot
 a former warehouse where trainees can test their skills in progressing as a unit.

 Thuillots
 An "old town" district located in the military camp, still partially occupied, especially by CENZUB's mechanical workshops. It simulates the outskirts of a village (woods, road, field, track) with several large buildings.

 Jeoffrecourt
 The village of Jeoffrecourt represents a town of 5000 inhabitants, with tall buildings, commercial areas. It will simultaneously engage all military resources, including infantry, armour, artillery, engineers and aircraft. It has a main objective of training and restitution.

 Urban firing complex (Complexe de Tir en Zone UrBaine - CT ZUB)
 This range enables firing in an urban environment to add realism to the training.

 Opposing force (FORce ADverse - FORAD)
 105 personnel (including women) act as opposing forces or civilians for realism. They are structured as a mixed company with two infantry sections on VAB armoured personnel carriers or trucks, a tank platoon with AMX-30 tanks and an engineering section equipped with MPG and EBG. This unit is able to play the role of a regular combat unit, militia, or civilian refugees, depending on the scenario.

See also
 Stanford Battle Area

References

External links
 Centre d'entraînement aux actions en zone urbaine (in French)

Urban warfare
Training establishments of the French Army
Aisne